The Order of the Founders and Patriots of America (OFPA) is a non-profit, hereditary organization based in the United States that is dedicated to promoting patriotism and preserving historical records of the first colonists and their descendants.  The Order is made up of "Associates" who trace their ancestry back to those first colonists and who have forefathers in the same male ancestral line who served in the American Revolution. Today, as in the past, it is composed of a wide range of individuals, all linked by a common heritage and dedicated to American ideals.

The Order has relatively strict bloodline mandates that have earned it a reputation as the most exclusive lineage society in the United States. However, unlike the Society of the Cincinnati, membership eligibility does not descend through family lines to a single eligible male for each ancestor, meaning that more than one member of the same family can simultaneously hold membership.

History

Founding
The OFPA was incorporated in New York state on March 17, 1896.  The first meeting at which all the Charter members gathered was on 17 April 1896 at the Hotel Normandie in New York City.  At that time, there were several hereditary organizations for descendants of Patriots of the American Revolution as well as for descendants of early American colonists (i.e. Founders).  The OFPA is the only organization to require descent from both a Founder who was in the American Colonies by 1657 (50 years after the founding of Jamestown) and a Patriot in the same male line who was loyal to the cause of American independence during the Revolutionary War.

The first Governor General of the Order was Frederick Dent Grant, the first son of General and President of the United States Ulysses S. Grant and Julia Grant.  The first annual banquet of the Order was held on February 2, 1897, in the Hotel Manhattan in New York City with over 200 members and guests in attendance, as reported in the New York Times.

Membership
Membership in the OFPA is open to male U.S. citizens age 18 or more of "good moral character and reputation" who are directly descended in the male line of either parent from an ancestor who settled, prior to May 13, 1657, in the territory that would become the Thirteen Colonies and one or all of whose intermediate ancestors in the same line, who lived in the period of the American Revolution from 1775 to 1783, adhered as patriots to the cause of the colonies.  In addition, if the father or either the paternal or maternal grandfather of the prospective member met these qualifications he would also be eligible.  This means there are five of the eight potential great-grandparent lines that are eligible for membership.

Societies
The OFPA is organized into state and regional chapters known as Societies. A new society receives a Charter from the Order once it meets certain conditions and the society is responsible for collecting national dues from its members that are paid to the Order annually.  Each state society is headed by a Governor and individual members in the state societies are referred to as "Associates."  These societies, together, comprise the general Order which is headed by a Governor General. The Order is headquartered in Ohio.

Activities
The activities of the General Order and State Societies encompass:

Awards Program

The Order of the Founders and Patriots of America has a comprehensive Awards Program that provides for recognition of top-performing U.S. National Guard and ROTC units and graduating ROTC cadets plus deserving individual recipients.  Awards are made by both the national Order and the state societies.

The OFPA state societies present awards annually to outstanding college Army, Navy and Air Force ROTC cadets and midshipmen at universities within their state. The state societies also present separate awards to outstanding Army National Guard units within their state. The National Order may also present an award to a single outstanding ROTC program at an American university.  The "Order of the Founders and Patriots of America Award" has been called "the Heisman Trophy of Army ROTC" and is awarded based on criteria that include the number of United States Army officers a unit commissions and the academic performance of cadets.

The Order also underwrites individual annual awards to cadets and midshipmen at the four U.S. military academies that are named for past Governors General of the Order. The Admiral George Dewey Class of 1858 Award is presented to a United States Naval Academy midshipman, the Lt. General Herman Nickerson Sword Award is presented to a United States Marine Corps midshipman at the United States Naval Academy, the Lt. General John MacNair Wright Jr., Class of 1940 Award is presented to an outstanding West Point cadet and the Falcon Award for Physics is presented to a deserving United States Air Force Academy cadet.

Archives and monuments
The OFPA and its member societies fund the erection and installation of monuments and markers at the sites of historical occurrences in early United States and colonial American history.  The Order also sells an OFPA grave marker that can be used to mark the grave of a deceased member.  The Order maintains genealogical archives on its members. This includes 162 boxes of material deposited at Langsdale Library at the University of Baltimore that have also been digitized.  Additional records curated by individual societies are stored elsewhere, including Rutgers University, and the Connecticut State Library.

Meetings
Each State Society holds annual meetings and other gatherings appropriate for carrying out their programs.  The general Order holds an annual meeting, known as the General Court, each year in May–June. The 124th General Court of the OFPA in 2020 was originally scheduled to be held in Plymouth, MA to celebrate the 400th anniversary of the Mayflower landing there.  Due to COVID-19 restrictions, this General Court was moved to The Greenbrier Resort in White Sulphur Springs, WV and held on June 10–12, 2020.  The 125th General Court was held May 14–17, 2021 in New Orleans, LA. The 126th General Court in 2021 was held in late June 2022 in Boston, MA, and the 127th General Court will be held in Princeton, NJ from May 18–21, 2023.

Some of the other past General Courts of the OFPA were:
 The 123rd General Court in 2019 at the Omni Hotel in Richmond, VA with tours of the Jamestown Colony and the American Revolution Museum at Yorktown
 The 122nd General Court in 2018 at the Dearborn Inn in Dearborn, MI with tours of Greenfield Village, the Henry Ford Museum and the Ford Rouge Plant
 The 121st General Court in 2017 at the JW Marriott Atlanta-Buckhead in Atlanta, GA with tours of the World of Coca-Cola
 The 120th General Court in 2016 at the Brown Palace Hotel in Denver, CO with tours of the American Museum of Western Art, the Denver Mint and the Buffalo Bill Museum
 The 119th General Court in 2015 at Anderson House in Washington, DC
 The 118th General Court in 2014 at the Seelbach Hilton Hotel in Louisville, KY. To commemorate the general court being held in Kentucky, all of its associates were commissioned as Kentucky Colonels by the governor of Kentucky.

Publications
The OFPA periodically publishes The Bulletin, a semi-annual magazine for associates.  The Order has also published multiple volumes of The Register, an index of the genealogical pedigree of all associates.  Volume Five of The Register is currently available for purchase on the OFPA website.  The Order also publishes a book entitled Founders of Early American Families, that contains historical information about the male heads of families who emigrated to the 13 original colonies from 1607 to 1657.  The latest version is the Second Revised Edition that contains entries for 4,490 Founders plus a roster of current members, Governors, General Officers and a list of all past Governors General of the Order.

Notable members
 Henry Adams - recipient of the 1919 Pulitzer Prize, descendant of John Adams
 Herman Vandenberg Ames - dean of the graduate school of the University of Pennsylvania
 James J. Belden - member of the U.S. Congress
 Thomas W. Bicknell - American educator, historian, and author and noted anti-segregationist
 Lucius E. Chittenden - member of the Vermont Senate
 Charles Gates Dawes - Vice President of the United States
 James D. Dewell - Lieutenant Governor of Connecticut
 George Dewey - Admiral of the U.S. Navy
 Ferdinand P. Earle - Brigadier General of the New York National Guard
 Frederick Dent Grant - Son of President Ulysses S. Grant and U.S. Ambassador to Austria
 Ulysses S. Grant III - Grandson of President Ulysses S. Grant and U.S. Army general
 Warren G. Harding - 29th President of the United States
 John Grier Hibben - president of Princeton University
 George Rogers Howell - American historian, genealogist, and writer
 James Kneeland - founder of the Milwaukee Gas Light Company
 Richard Worsam Meade III - U.S. Navy admiral
 Robert Barnwell Roosevelt - member of the U.S. Congress and Minister to the Hague
 William Howard Taft - President of the United States
 John Boyd Thacher - Mayor of Albany, New York
 Chauncey Pratt Williams - Adjutant-General of New York
 John B. Winslow - chief justice of the Wisconsin Supreme Court

See also

 Society of the Cincinnati
 Sons of the Revolution
 Sons of the American Revolution

References

Lineage societies
Organizations established in 1896
Patriotic societies
Fraternal orders
1896 establishments in New York (state)